Hasnain Abbas (born 1 January 1984) is a Pakistani cricketer. He played in 19 first-class and 11 List A matches between 2001 and 2008. He made his Twenty20 debut on 25 April 2005, for Multan Tigers in the 2004–05 National Twenty20 Cup.

References

External links
 

1984 births
Living people
Pakistani cricketers
Multan cricketers
Pakistan Customs cricketers